Küçüksöğle, Elmalı is a village in the District of Elmalı, Antalya Province, Turkey. May have been the place of the antique Lycian (actually Milyas) town of Soklai

References

Villages in Elmalı District